Osun State College of Technology (OSCOTECH) is a tertiary learning institution in Esa-Oke, Osun State, Nigeria.

The college was formerly a satellite campus of the Ibadan Polytechnic. 
It became autonomous on 12 October 1992 when the Governor of Osun State, Isiaka Adetunji Adeleke, signed the law establishing the institution.
The Osun State College of Technology was acclaimed by the National Board for Technical Education (NBTE) as one of the fastest growing Polytechnic in Nigeria in 2000, and again in 2006.

See also
List of polytechnics in Nigeria

References

Universities and colleges in Nigeria
Osun State
Educational institutions established in 1992
1992 establishments in Nigeria